Unbreakable International is an Australian media company responsible for film, television and music productions.

Divisions 
Film – Development and production of film.
Television – Development and production of content for television.
Music – Production of music based events

Film
Feature film in development 2015.

Television
Bondi Ink Tattoo Crew series one (10 × 60') goes behind the scenes at the busiest tattoo store in Australia during the frenetic summer season on the one and only Bondi Beach. A group of talented young artists show what they are really made of and, along with the help of the stars of NY Ink Mike Diamond and world-famous tattoo artist Megan Massacre the shop sees some incredible summer stories put into ink. An Unbreakable International Production for Network Ten (Australia).

References

External links
Unbreakable International official Unbreakable International website
Unbreakable International official Unbreakable International Facebook page
Google+

Mass media companies of Australia